Pieris japonica, the Japanese andromeda or Japanese pieris, is a species of flowering plant in the heath family Ericaceae. It is native to eastern China, Taiwan, and Japan, where it grows in mountain thickets. This medium-sized evergreen shrub or tree is widely cultivated in gardens.

Description
The leaves open bronze or red in some cultivars, turning green. The trusses of small urn-shaped flowers are white or pink, appearing early in spring, and providing a decorative effect against the young red leaves. The flowers usually last two or three weeks.

The plant is poisonous if consumed. The toxicity is a result of the grayanotoxins contained by the flowers and leaves. If flowers and leaves are ingested by humans, symptoms may include salivation, headaches, vomiting, cardiac failure, and death. Cattle, goats, horses, dogs, and cats may suffer similar symptoms after ingesting the leaves or flowers of this plant. 

The name "andromeda" originated from an earlier genus name for the plant.

Cultivation
Pieris japonica is a popular temperate garden plant, producing colour in early spring. A calcifuge, it requires acid pH soil, typically in a partially shaded setting such as dappled woodland. It associates well with camellias, rhododendrons, and other lime-hating plants.

Cultivars
The following cultivars have received the Royal Horticultural Society's Award of Garden Merit:
'Blush' pink/red flowers,  
'Bonfire' - pink/white flowers,   
'Carnaval' red/pink leaves turning green edged white, white flowers,  
'Cavatine' - white flowers,  
'Debutante' - cream flowers,  
'Firecrest' - foliage red to green, flowers pink  
'Flaming Silver' - young red foliage turning green margined silver,  
'Mountain Fire' - red leaves turning green, white flowers   
'Pink Delight' - foliage bronze to green, flowers pink to white,  
'Prelude' - cream/white flowers,  
'Purity' - white flowers,  
'Sarabande' - white flowers,  
'Valley Valentine' - red flowers,

References

External links
Pieris japonica Images at bioimages.Flavon's Wild herb and Alpine plants 
- information about the poisonous connection to this plant
Wikimedia Commons Pieris japonica image gallery.

japonica
Flora of China
Flora of Japan
Flora of Taiwan
Garden plants